Deutsche Entomologische Zeitschrift is a peer-reviewed open access scientific journal covering systematic and taxonomic entomology. It was established in 1857 as Berliner Entomologische Zeitschrift and obtained its current title in 1875.

Berliner Entomologische Zeitschrift and Deutsche Entomologische Zeitschrift 
In 1857 the then 26-year old Gustav Kraatz published the first issue of the Berliner Entomologische Zeitschrift, the journal of the "Entomologischen Vereine in Berlin" (Entomological Associations in Berlin).

In 1875, starting with the 19th volume, the journal was renamed Deutsche Entomologische Zeitschrift (bisher "Berliner Entomologische Zeitschrift"). By that time Kraatz was still the editor.

The appearance of the Deutsche Entomologische Zeitschrift did not lead to the disappearance of the Berliner Entomologische Zeitschrift. The Berliner Entomologische Zeitschrift would continue to appear until 1913.

Deutsche Entomologische Zeitschrift and (Internationale) Entomologische Zeitschrift 
The (Berliner, later) Deutsche Entomologische Zeitschrift (founded 1857, respectively 1875) is not the same as the Entomologische Zeitschrift, founded by the (Internationale) Entomologische Verein in 1887, and published in Frankfurt a.M..

References

External links 
 

Systematics journals
Publications established in 1857
Creative Commons Attribution-licensed journals
Pensoft Publishers academic journals
1857 establishments in Prussia
Entomology journals and magazines